Marco da Silva (born 10 April 1992) is a French footballer who plays as a midfielder.

Career
Da Silva is a former graduate of the Clairefontaine academy. After leaving Clairefontaine, da Silva joined Valenciennes and was promoted to its reserve team after two seasons in the club's youth academy. He helped the team earn promotion to the Championnat de France amateur in the 2010–11 season and is the team's current captain. Da Silva made his professional debut with Valenciennes on 31 August 2011 against Dijon in the Coupe de la Ligue. He started the match and was substituted out after 73 minutes as Valenciennes were defeated 3–2.

References

External links
 Profile at Soccerway
 

1992 births
Living people
French footballers
French expatriate footballers
Association football midfielders
Valenciennes FC players
NK Krško players
NK Domžale players
Ligue 1 players
Slovenian PrvaLiga players
French expatriate sportspeople in Slovenia
Expatriate footballers in Slovenia